"Ave Maria" is a much-recorded aria, composed by Vladimir Vavilov around 1970.  Vavilov himself published and recorded it in 1970 on the Melodiya label with the ascription "Anonymous". It is believed that organist Mark Shakhin, one of the performers on the "Melodiya" LP, first ascribed the work to Giulio Caccini after Vavilov's death, and gave the "newly-discovered scores" to other musicians. The organist Oleg Yanchenko then made an arrangement of the aria for a recording by Irina Arkhipova in 1987, after which the piece came to be famous worldwide.

Selected list of recorded versions
 1970 – Vladimir Vavilov (vocal Nadezhda Vainer), Melodiya label
 1980s- Alexander Akimov, arranged for horn solo with mallet accompaniment, Soviet TV  
 1987 – Irina Arkhipova, arranged by Oleg Yanchenko
 1994 – Inessa Galante, arranged for organ, on the live album Musica Sacra, Campion label
 1994 – Ilga Tiknuse, on the album The Organ of Riga Dome vol.3
 1995 – Inessa Galante, arranged by Georgs Brinums on the album Debut, Campion label
 1997 – Lesley Garrett, arranged by Nick Ingman, on the album A Soprano Inspired
 1998 – Charlotte Church, arranged by Nick Ingman, on the album Voice of an Angel
 1998 – Julian Lloyd Webber on the album Cello Moods
 1999 – Andrea Bocelli, on the album Sacred Arias
 2001 – Sumi Jo, arranged by Steven Mercurio, on the album Prayers
 2003 – Minako Honda, on the album Ave Maria
 2005 – Hayley Westenra, arranged by Steven Mercurio, on the album Odyssey
 2008 – Kokia, on the album The Voice
 2008 – Libera, on the album New Dawn
 2014 – Jackie Evancho, on the album Awakening
 2014 – Elina Garanca, on the album Meditation
 2015 – Tarja Turunen, on the album Ave Maria – En Plein Air
 2021 - Marina Rebeka, on the album "Credo"

Use in films and trailers 
 Donnie Darko (2001)
 Stairway to Heaven (2003 TV series)
 Trollywood (2004)
 Our Lady of the Assassins (2000, American release trailer)

See also 
 "Ave Maria" by German composer Johann Sebastian Bach, and French composer Charles Gounod.
 "Ave Maria" by Austrian composer Franz Schubert.

References
 http://www.avemariasongs.org/aves/V/Vavilov.htm
 Entry "Vladimir F. Vavilov" in Illustrated Biographical Encyclopedic Dictionary (Russian) lists the Melodia label as 1970, not 1972.

Arias
Compositions with a spurious or doubtful attribution
1970 compositions
1970 songs
Musical hoaxes
Compositions in F minor